Monte Santo ( or  in Sardinian language) is an isolated Sardinian mountain and a mesa in Logudoro's northern province of Sassari (Italy).

The most substantial portion of the mountain is located in the territory of Siligo. However, some parts belong to the comunes of Ardara, Bonnanaro and Mores.

On the summit plateau is the church of St. Elias and st. Enoch, who appeared in the list of goods in the gift, made in favor of the abbey of Montecassino in eleventh century from Judge Barisone I of Torres

References

External links 
 Sardegna Cultura - The church of the st. Elijah and Enoch

Mountains of Sardinia
Mesas